The Color or The Colour may refer to:

 The Color (band), a Canadian Christian music group
 The Color (album), a 2011 album by Yellowbirds
 The Colour, a defunct American band whose guitarist now fronts the band The Romany Rye
 The Colour, a 2003 novel by Rose Tremain

See also 
 Color (disambiguation)